Coitus reservatus (coitus, "sexual intercourse, union" and reservatus, "reserved, saved"), also known as sexual continence, is a form of sexual intercourse in which a male does not attempt to ejaculate within his partner, but instead attempts to remain at the plateau phase of intercourse for as long as possible, avoiding the seminal emission. It is distinct from death-grip syndrome, wherein a male has no volition in his emissionless state.

Alice Stockham coined the term karezza, derived from the Italian word "carezza" meaning "caress", to describe coitus reservatus, but the idea was already in practice at the Oneida Community. Alan Watts believed, in error, that karezza was a Persian word. The concept of karezza is loosely akin to maithuna in Hindu Tantra and Sahaja in Hindu Yoga.

Control of ejaculation is contained in Taoist sexual practices (known as "cai Yin pu Yang" and "cai Yang pu Yin"), as well as Indian Tantra (known as "asidhārāvrata") and Hatha Yoga (see vajroli mudra), although conventional ejaculation is also endorsed.

Practice of karezza and sexual continence 
Stockham writes, "... Karezza signifies 'to express affection in both words and action,' and while it fittingly denotes the union that is the outcome of deepest human affection, love's consummation, it is used technically throughout this work to designate a controlled sexual union." So that, in practice, according to Stockham, it is more than just self-control, but mutual control where the penetrative partner helps the receptive partner and vice versa. According to Stockham, this is the key to overcoming many difficulties in controlling sexual expression individually.
Stockham's contribution was to apply this same philosophy of orgasm control to women as much as to men. A form of birth control, the technique also prolongs sexual pleasure to the point of achieving mystical ecstasy, according to J. William Lloyd, a practitioner of Karezza, whose own experience of cosmic consciousness appears in  Cosmic Consciousness, a book written by the Canadian psychiatrist Richard M. Bucke, a friend of the American poet Walt Whitman. In this practice,  orgasm is separated from ejaculation, making possible enjoyment of the pleasure of sexual intercourse without experiencing seminal ejaculation, while still experiencing orgasm.

Some would have the principles of karezza applied to masturbation, whereby a person attempts to delay orgasm as long as possible to prolong pleasure in a process known as "orgasmic brinkmanship", "surfing", or "edging," but this is different from the heterosexual practice of "karezza". In Latin literature, this is known as coitus sine ejaculatione seminis.

One purpose of karezza is the maintenance and intensification of desire and enjoyment of sexual pleasure within relationships. According to Stockham, it takes from two weeks to a month for the body to recover from ejaculation ... "Unless procreation is desired, let the final propagative orgasm be entirely avoided". Stockham advocated that the 'honeymoon period' of a relationship could be maintained in perpetuity by limiting the frequency of ejaculations, or, preferably avoiding them entirely.

Kalman Andras Oszlar writes, "Inasmuch as sexual togetherness is not limited into the physical world and does not mean quick wasting of sexual energies, by this we give free way to higher dimensions in the relationship." Affected by this, we may get into the state of flow, and in the course of this, the couple charges up with energy, while – with focused attention (Dhāraṇā) – the couple is submerging in that in which they are having pleasure. This state of mind is connected with the beneficial effects of tantric restraint and transformation. At first, Mihály Csíkszentmihályi defined positive philosophy, and since then, it has been referred to beyond the professional line. According to the professor, the flow experience is an entirely focused and motivationally intensified experience where people can entirely focus and properly command their feelings for the best performance or learning.

There is a slight difference between karezza and coitus reservatus. In coitus reservatus, unlike karezza, a woman can enjoy a prolonged orgasm while a man exercises self-control.

Like coitus interruptus, coitus reservatus is not a reliable form of preventing a sexually transmitted disease, as the penis leaks pre-ejaculate before ejaculation, which may contain all of the same infectious viral particles and bacteria as the semen. Although studies have not found sperm in pre-ejaculate fluid, the method is also unreliable for contraception because of the difficulty of controlling ejaculation beyond the point of no return. Additionally, pre-ejaculate fluid can collect sperm from a previous ejaculation, leading to pregnancy even when performed correctly.

Claims of the semen retention community and those of the NoFap community are among the least accurate concerning men's health.

Views

Catholic Church 
Many theologians within the Catholic tradition approve of coitus reservatus with precise guidelines.
 In 6.918 of Moral Theology (Liguori), St. Alphonsus Liguori allows it in marriage, if mutual (when both spouses restrain themselves from orgasm), according to citation by author Peter Gardella.
 The Holy See in volume number 44 of Acta Apostolicae Sedis admonishes amplexum reservatum (embracement reserved): Sacerdotes autem (Priests moreover), in cura animarum (in the care of souls) et in conscientiis dirigendis (and in the directing of consciences), numquam (never), sive sponte sive interrogati (if own initiative or if questioned), ita loqui praesumant quasi (presume to speak as if) ex parte legis christianae (on the part of the Christian law) contra « amplexum reservatum » nihil esset obiicendum (was no objection against ‘amplexus reservatus’ ). 
 John F. Harvey OSFS expressed this to mean that "confessors and spiritual directors should not presume that there is nothing objectionable" with it. This indicates it could become sinful under certain circumstances, for example, if ending in masturbation. For more details see next bullet point.
 In the article hosted on the US Conference of Catholic Bishops website, John F. Harvey OSFS confirmed and explained coitus reservatus. The spouses should avoid undue frustration. They must not intend orgasm for either of them. If unintentionally one of them reaches the climax, then they must try to stimulate the other spouse to reach the climax, too.
 
This differs from non-penetrative, rubbing-only sex (mutual masturbation, or masturbation) and differs from coitus interruptus because coitus reservatus ends with no orgasm at all for both spouses if practiced within guidelines from John F. Harvey OSFS referenced above.

 Oneida Community 
The Oneida Community, founded in the 19th century by John Humphrey Noyes, experimented with coitus reservatus, which was then called male continence in a religiously Christian communalist environment. The experiment lasted for about a quarter of a century, and then Noyes created Oneida silverware and established the Oneida Silver Co., which grew into Oneida Limited.  Noyes identified three functions of the sexual organs: the urinary, the propagative, and the amative. Noyes believed in the separation of the amative from the propagative, and he put amative sexual intercourse on the same footing as other ordinary forms of social interchange. Sexual intercourse, as Noyes defines it is the insertion of the penis into the vagina; ejaculation is not a requirement for sexual intercourse.

 Western esotericism 
 Ida Craddock, C. F. Russell, and Louis T. Culling 

Inspired by Ida Craddock's work Heavenly Bridegrooms, American occultist C. F. Russell developed a curriculum of sex magick.  In the 1960s, disciple Louis T. Culling published these in two works entitled The Complete Magickal Curriculum of the Secret Order G.'.B.'.G.'. and Sex Magick.  The first two degrees are "Alphaism and Dianism". Culling writes that Dianism is "sexual congress without bringing it to climax" and that each participant is to regard their partner, not as a "known earthly personality" but as a "visible manifestation of one's Holy Guardian Angel.

 Rosicrucian groups 
AMORC does not recommend engaging in sexual practices of an occult nature. This has been so since their First Imperator H. Spencer Lewis, Ph.D. made it public knowledge. 

The Fraternitas Rosae Crucis led by Dr. R. Swinburne Clymer engages in sexual practices for the sake of race regeneration. Dr. Clymer is completely opposed to the practice of karezza or coitus reservatus and advocates instead a form of sexual intercourse in which the couple experiences the orgasm at the same time. 

The Secretary of the FUDOSI instead approved the practice of karezza to establish harmony in the family and the world by preventing the waste and misuse of sex energy.

Dr. Arnold Krumm-Heller established the Fraternitas Rosicruciana Antiqua (FRA), a Rosicrucian school in Germany with branches in South America, having the following formula of sexual conduct: "Immissio Membri Virile In Vaginae Sine Ejaculatio Seminis" (Introduce the penis in the vagina without ejaculating the semen). Samael Aun Weor experimented with that formula and developed the doctrine of The Perfect Matrimony.

 20th-century Western writers 
English novelist Aldous Huxley, in his last novel Island, wrote that Maithuna, the Yoga of Love, is "the same as what Roman Catholicism means by coitus reservatus." Getting to the point by discussing coitus reservatus, Alan W. Watts in Nature, Man and Woman notes: "...I would like to see someone make a case for the idea that the Apostles really did hand down an inner tradition to the Church, and that through all these centuries the Church has managed to guard it from the public eye. If so, it has remained far more secret and "esoteric" than in any of the other great spiritual traditions of the world, so much so that its existence is highly doubtful..." The Welsh writer Norman Lewis, in his celebrated account of life in Naples in 1944, claimed that San Rocco was the patron saint of coitus reservatus:  "I recommended him to drink -- as the locals did -- marsala with the yolk of eggs stirred into it, and to wear a medal of San Rocco, patron of coitus reservatus, which could be had in any religious-supplies shop". The psychologist Havelock Ellis writes: "Coitus Reservatus'', – in which intercourse is maintained even for very long periods, during which a woman may orgasm several times while the penetrative partner succeeds in holding back orgasm – so far from being injurious to a woman, is probably the form of coitus which gives her the maximum gratification and relief".

Controversy 
Alice Stockham was taken to court and forced to give up teaching the practice of karezza in the United States. Like many other sex reformers, Dr. Stockham was arrested by Anthony Comstock, who sent a variety of spiritual marriage reformers to jail for long terms, including Paschal Beverly Randolph, who had been a personal friend of Abraham Lincoln. Ida Craddock committed suicide after being repeatedly jailed for peddling pornography. The press attacked the Oneida Community and Noyes fled to Canada due to a warrant being issued for his arrest on a statutory rape charge on June 22, 1879. From there, he advised others to follow St. Paul's plan of either marriage or celibacy, and to obey the commandments against adultery and fornication.

See also

 Coitus interruptus
 Coitus saxonicus
 Eroto-comatose lucidity
 Orgone
 Edging
 Sex magic
 Tantric sex
 Taoist sexual practices
 Venus Butterfly

References

Further reading
 Republished: 

 Also available as

External links

 (Audio Book)

Sexual acts
Virtue